Kadhaveedu is a 2013 Indian Malayalam anthology film written and directed by Sohanlal, based on three stories penned by Vaikkom Muhammad Basheer, Madhavikutty, and M. T. Vasudevan Nair. The film stars Kunchacko Boban in the lead role, with Biju Menon, Rituparna Sengupta, Bhama, Manoj K. Jayan, Lal, Mallika, and Kalabhavan Shajon. The film was released on November 2 coinciding with the Diwali fest.

Plot

Cast
 Kunchacko Boban as Raj Karthik
 Kiran Arakkal Sanand as Master Raj Karthik
 Biju Menon as Balachandran
 Manoj K. Jayan as Khadar
 Lal as Major Chandran Mukundan
 Rituparna Sengupta as Reeta
 Bhama as Jeena
 Mallika as Jameela 
 Kalabhavan Shajon as Joseph

Production

The film is an anthology with adaptations of stories written by renowned Malayalam fiction writers Vaikkom Muhammad Basheer, Madhavikutty, and M. T. Vasudevan Nair. The stories have been tweaked to fit in a modern setting and the script has been conceived by the director himself. Bengali actress Rituparna Sengupta forayed into Malayalam cinema by playing an important role in the film. She was suggested for the role by director Priyadarshan with whom she had worked in the film Bumm Bumm Bole. "Director Sohanlal has been pursuing me for the role for a year now. But once I heard the role of Rita, I knew it had all the subtleties for a great performance. Plus, the script read more like poetry rather than a scene-by-scene film," says Rituparna. Actress Bhama plays the female lead in MT's script, opposite Kunchacko Boban. She plays the role of a scribe. Kadhaveedu is Sohanlal's second feature film.

Soundtrack

Songs were composed by M. Jayachandran, with lyrics written by Sohanlal and O. N. V. Kurup ("Aliveni Churulveni").

 "Kaattile poomanam" (Shweta Mohan)
 "Marakkanullathu" (K.S.Chitra)
 "Aliveni Churulveni" (Madhu Balakrishnan, Mridula Warrier)

References

External links

2013 films
2010s Malayalam-language films
Indian anthology films
Films based on short fiction
Films with screenplays by M. T. Vasudevan Nair
Indian romantic drama films
Films scored by M. Jayachandran
2013 romantic drama films